Skyler Emerson Stromsmoe (born March 30, 1984) is a Canadian professional baseball utility player who is a free agent. Prior to beginning his professional career, he played college baseball at Longview Community College and Southern Arkansas University. Stromsmoe has also competed for the Canadian national baseball team.

Career
Stromsmoe went to Longview High School in Lee's Summit, Missouri. He attended Longview Community College. He transferred to Southern Arkansas University, where he played for the Southern Arkansas Muleriders team in the Gulf South Conference of the National Collegiate Athletic Association's Division II.

Stromsmoe has played for the Canadian national baseball team. In 2011, he participated in the 2011 Baseball World Cup, winning the bronze medal, and the Pan American Games, winning the gold medal.

References

External links

1984 births
Living people
Arizona League Giants players
Augusta GreenJackets players
Baseball people from Alberta
Baseball players at the 2011 Pan American Games
Baseball players at the 2015 Pan American Games
Canada national baseball team players
Canadian expatriate baseball players in the United States
Fresno Grizzlies players
Pan American Games gold medalists for Canada
Pan American Games medalists in baseball
People from the County of Forty Mile No. 8
Richmond Flying Squirrels players
Sacramento River Cats players
Salem-Keizer Volcanoes players
San Jose Giants players
Southern Arkansas Muleriders baseball players
2015 WBSC Premier12 players
Medalists at the 2015 Pan American Games
Medalists at the 2011 Pan American Games